English musician Phil Collins has released 8 studio albums, 1 live album, 5 compilation albums, 2 remix albums, 2 soundtrack albums, 2 box sets, 50 singles, 18 video albums, and 41 music videos. A Grammy and Academy Award-winning solo artist, Collins has sold more than 34.5 million albums in the United States, and 150 million records worldwide.

Collins's first solo album, Face Value, was released in the United Kingdom in 1981 and reached number one in the United Kingdom, Canada, and Sweden. It was also certified 5-times Platinum by the British Phonographic Industry (BPI). The album's lead single, "In the Air Tonight", reached number one in Austria, Germany, Ireland, New Zealand, Sweden, and Switzerland, and is often cited as his signature song. His second album, Hello, I Must Be Going!, was released in 1982 and included the UK number one "You Can't Hurry Love", which also topped the charts in Ireland and the Netherlands. The album went number one in Canada while peaking at number two in the UK and receiving a triple-platinum certification from the BPI. In 1984, Collins recorded "Against All Odds"; the ballad shot to number one on the US Billboard Hot 100 and number two in the UK. He also performed a duet with Philip Bailey, "Easy Lover", which reached number two in the US and spent four weeks at number one in the UK. In 1984, Collins participated in Bob Geldof's Band Aid charity project for the famine in Ethiopia, and played drums in the Band Aid single "Do They Know It's Christmas?".

In 1985, Collins released his third album, No Jacket Required, which contained the hits "Sussudio" and "One More Night". He also recorded the song "Separate Lives", a duet with Marilyn Martin that reached number one in the US. No Jacket Required debuted at number one in the US and UK; it is the best-selling album of his career and has been certified Diamond in the US for sales over 10 million and six-times platinum in the UK. In 1988, Collins contributed songs to the soundtrack of the film Buster, in which he also starred: "Two Hearts", and a cover of "A Groovy Kind of Love", the latter of which became a UK and US number one. In 1989 Collins produced another successful album, ...But Seriously, featuring the anti-homelessness anthem "Another Day in Paradise", which peaked at number one in the US and number two in the UK. A live album, Serious Hits... Live! followed in 1990.

Collins's fifth album, Both Sides, was released in 1993; although it was less successful than his previous albums and produced only one UK top-ten single, the album still reached number one in the UK. His next album, Dance into the Light, was released in 1996 and was even less successful, peaking at number four in the UK and was only certified silver. A greatest hits compilation, ...Hits, was released in 1998 and was successful, returning Collins to UK number one and multi-platinum status in the UK and US. The album's sole new track was a cover of the Cyndi Lauper hit "True Colors". Collins also wrote and performed songs for the Disney animated films Tarzan and Brother Bear. Collins's seventh studio album, Testify, was released in 2002. It was a success in Europe, peaking at number fifteen in the UK and within the top five in Austria, Germany and the Netherlands. After the release of Testify, Collins announced that he was going into semi-retirement, and released two compilation albums in 2004, The Platinum Collection and Love Songs: A Compilation... Old and New. In 2010, Collins released his eighth and final studio album, Going Back, after which he went into a brief four-year retirement, before returning to the music industry in 2015. By 2016, Collins remastered and reissued all of his studio albums and released his fourth compilation album, The Singles.

Albums

Studio albums

Live albums

Compilation albums

Box sets

Soundtrack albums

Remix albums

Singles

As lead artist

Note:

Promotional singles and other charted songs

As featured artist

Videos

Video albums

Music videos

Other appearances

See also
Phil Collins
The Phil Collins Big Band
Touring and studio musicians of Phil Collins
Awards and nominations
Genesis discography

References
General

Specific

External links

Phil Collins at Musicbrainz

Discography
Rock music discographies
Discographies of British artists
Pop music discographies